Wilmer H. Struebing (April 2, 1910 – January 7, 2003) was a member of the Wisconsin State Assembly.

Biography
Struebing was born on April 2, 1910, in Brillion. On February 10, 1937, he married Henrietta Vaupel. They had four children. Struebing died on January 7, 2003, in New Holstein.

Career
Struebing was a member of the Assembly from 1963 to 1967. Additionally, he was Chairman of the Brillion Town Board and a member of the Town of Brillion School Board and the Calumet County, Wisconsin Board. Later, he became Chief Clerk of the Assembly in 1967 and Assistant Chief Clerk of the Wisconsin State Senate.

References

External links

People from Brillion, Wisconsin
Employees of the Wisconsin Legislature
County supervisors in Wisconsin
Members of the Wisconsin State Assembly
School board members in Wisconsin
1910 births
2003 deaths
20th-century American politicians